Robert Breuwer (born 29 September 1907, date of death unknown) was a Belgian basketball player. He competed in the men's tournament at the 1936 Summer Olympics.

References

1907 births
Year of death missing
Belgian men's basketball players
Olympic basketball players of Belgium
Basketball players at the 1936 Summer Olympics
Sportspeople from Brussels